Aguirre is a surname of Basque origin. It shows different variants (Agerre, Agerri, Ager) and composite surnames (Eizagirre, Agirresarobe, Agirrezabala, etc.), meaning 'prominent' or 'exposed prominence/place'. Lope de Aguirre was one of the first Europeans to explore the Americas. Based on "the U.S. Census Bureau's 1990 and 2000 censuses," HowManyofMe.com estimates in mid-2013 that 68,990 people bear the surname Aguirre in the United States, making the name statistically the country's 508th most common surname.

People with the surname

Arts and entertainment

 Adriana Aguirre (born 1951), Argentine actress, vedette
 Amber Aguirre (born 1958), American ceramic sculptor
 Ann Aguirre, American speculative fiction author
 Arantxa Aguirre, Spanish film director
 Carmen Aguirre, Canadian and Chilean actor, playwright, and writer
 Celso Aguirre Bernal (1916–1997), Mexican writer and historian
 Forrest Aguirre, American fantasy and horror author
 Francisco de Aguirre (painter) (fl. 1646), Spanish Baroque painter
 Francisco de Paula Aguirre (1875–1939), Venezuelan composer
 Ignacio Aguirre (1900–1990), Mexican engraver
 Margarita Aguirre (1925–2003), Chilean writer
 Maricarmen Arrigorriaga Aguirre (born 1957), Chilean television and film actress
 Memo Aguirre (born 1951), Chilean singer
 Ricardo Aguirre (1939–1969), Venezuelan musician
 Roberto Aguirre-Sacasa, American writer
 Rosa Aguirre (born 1908), Filipino actress
 Rosy Aguirre, Mexican voice actress
 Rubén Aguirre (1934–2016), Mexican actor

Politics
 Amado Aguirre Santiago (1863–1949), Mexican general and politician
 Eduardo Aguirre (diplomat) (born 1946), former United States Ambassador to Spain
 Elfego Hernán Monzón Aguirre (1912–1981), Guatemalan army officer and politician
 Esperanza Aguirre (born 1952), Spanish politician
 Gonzalo Aguirre (born 1940), Uruguayan politician
 José Antonio Aguirre (politician) (1904–1960), Basque politician and footballer
 José Joaquín Aguirre (1822–1901), Chilean physician and politician
 Juan Pedro Julián Aguirre y López de Anaya (1781–1837), Argentine politician
 Juana Aguirre Luco (1877–1963), First Lady of Chile, wife of President Pedro Aguirre Cerda
 Mike Aguirre (born 1949), American politician
 Pamela Aguirre Zambonino (born 1984), Ecuadorian lawyer and politician
 Pedro Aguirre Cerda (1879–1941), President of Chile 1938–1941
 Rhina Aguirre (1939–2020), Bolivian politician and disability activist
 Roberto Aguirre Solís (born 1957), Mexican politician
 Salvador Aguirre (Honduras), Honduran politician
 Vitaliano Aguirre II, Filipino lawyer and justice minister

Sports
 Carlos Aguirre (equestrian) (born 1952), Mexican Olympic equestrian
 Carlos Aguirre (volleyball) (born 1938), Mexican Olympic volleyball player
 Damaris Gabriela Aguirre (born 1977), Mexican Olympic weightlifter
 David Álvarez Aguirre (born 1984), naturalized Equatoguinean footballer
 Facundo Aguirre (born 1985), Argentine Olympic Alpine skier
 Francisco Aguirre Matos Mancebo (born 1970), Dominican baseball player and coach
 Gaizka Garitano Aguirre (born 1975), Basque football midfielder
 Gastón Aguirre (born 1981), Argentine football defender
 Gustavo Aguirre (born 1977), Argentine Olympic runner
 Hank Aguirre (1931–1994), American baseball pitcher
 Javier Aguirre (born 1958), Mexican football defender and coach
 Jeinkler Aguirre (born 1990), Cuban Olympic diver
 Jesús Aguirre (athlete) (1902–1954), Mexican Olympic athlete
 Jorge Aguirre (athlete), Mexican Olympic athlete
 Jorge Aguirre (judoka) (born 1962), Argentine Olympic judoka
 José Luis Aguirre (born 1967), Spanish Olympic rower
 Juan Aguirre (born 1970), Spanish Olympic rower
 Julio César Aguirre (born 1969), Colombian road cyclist
 Luis Aguirre (1911–?), Argentine Olympic sailor, brother of Rolando
 Mark Aguirre (born 1959), American basketball player
 Mason Aguirre (born 1987), American snowboarder
 Molly Aguirre (born 1984), American professional snowboarder
 Nicolás Aguirre (basketball) (born 1988), Argentine professional basketball player
 Nicolás Aguirre (footballer) (born 1990), Argentine football midfielder
 Ordan Aguirre (born 1955), Venezuelan footballer
 Roberto Aguirre (footballer) (born 1942), Argentine footballer
 Roberto Aguirre (football manager) (born 1968), Spanish football manager
 Rolando Aguirre (1904–1994), Argentine Olympic sailor, brother of Luis
 William Aguirre (born 1962), Nicaraguan Olympic runner

Others
 Álvaro Coutinho Aguirre (1899–1987), Brazilian agronomist, zoologist and naturalist
 Carl and Clarence Aguirre (born 2002), former conjoined twins, from Philippines
 Francisco de Aguirre (conquistador) (1508–1581), Spanish conquistador of Chile
 Gary J. Aguirre, American securities lawyer and investigator
 Gonzalo Aguirre Beltrán (1908–1996), Mexican anthropologist
 José Antonio Aguirre (early Californian) (1799–1860), Spanish settler in Alta California
 Joseph Saenz de Aguirre (1630–1699), Spanish cardinal
 Lope de Aguirre (–1561), Basque conquistador
 Marcelo Aguirre (disambiguation), several people
 Mary Bernard Aguirre (1844–1906), American educator
 Osmín Aguirre y Salinas (1889–1977), Salvadoran military officer
 Pedro de Aguirre, Spanish explorer of San Antonio, Texas, in the 18th century

See also
 Aguirre (disambiguation)

References

Surnames of Spanish origin
Spanish-language surnames
Basque-language surnames